Lake Ann is small man-made lake in the Bella Vista, region of northern Benton County, Arkansas. The lake was created by damming a small west flowing stream in Pinion Hollow that is a tributary to Little Sugar Creek. The lake lies about one mile east-southeast of Bella Vista Village.

References

Bodies of water of Benton County, Arkansas
Ann
Bella Vista, Arkansas